Phonology: Analysis and Theory is a 2002 book by Edmund Gussmann designed for an introductory course in phonology.

Reception
The book was reviewed by Gunnar Ólafur Hansson, Ken Lodge and Zoe Toft.

References

External links
Phonology: Analysis and Theory

2002 non-fiction books
Phonology books
Linguistics textbooks
Cambridge University Press books